Polk Township, Indiana may refer to one of the following places:

 Polk Township, Huntington County, Indiana
 Polk Township, Marshall County, Indiana
 Polk Township, Monroe County, Indiana
 Polk Township, Washington County, Indiana

See also 

Polk Township (disambiguation)

Indiana township disambiguation pages